Saint-Jean-le-Centenier is a commune in the Ardèche department in southern France.

Geography
The river Ibie has its source in the southern part of the commune.

Population

See also
 Communes of the Ardèche department

References

Communes of Ardèche
Ardèche communes articles needing translation from French Wikipedia